Ellesmere Port is an industrial town in Cheshire West and Chester, England.  It contains nine buildings that are recorded in the National Heritage List for England as designated listed buildings, all of which are at Grade II.  This grade is the lowest of the three gradings given to listed buildings and is applied to "buildings of national importance and special interest".  The buildings in the list include houses, a stable, a railway station, and a former cinema.

See also

Listed buildings in Capenhurst

Listed buildings in Frodsham
Listed buildings in Hale
Listed buildings in Ince

Listed buildings in Ledsham

Listed buildings in Liverpool
Listed buildings in Neston
Listed buildings in Puddington
Listed buildings in Thornton-le-Moors

References
Citations

Sources

Listed buildings in Cheshire West and Chester
Lists of listed buildings in Cheshire
Listed